Setesuyara is the goddess of the underworld, along with Batara Kala, in traditional Balinese mythology.

References

Balinese mythology
Death goddesses